Thomas F. Denney (September 20, 1874 – November 26, 1913) was an American politician from New York.

Life 
Denney was born on September 20, 1874, in New York City, New York, the son of Scottish immigrant John Denney and Irish immigrant Delia Gannan.

Denney worked in the hotel and restaurant business for twenty years in connection with controlling or checking systems, and one source considered him an expert in that field of hotel work. He was actively associated with the Monongahela Democratic Club and the General Committee of the Nineteenth Assembly District. In 1912, he was elected to the New York State Assembly as a Democrat, representing the New York County 19th District. He served in the Assembly in 1913. He lost the 1913 re-election to Progressive candidate Andrew F. Murray.

Denney died in a car collision that also killed three other people and injured five more on the Pelham Parkway, close to the Knickerbocker Inn, on November 26, 1913. He never married. He was buried in Calvary Cemetery.

References

External links 

 The Political Graveyard

1874 births
1913 deaths
American people of Scottish descent
American people of Irish descent
American hoteliers
20th-century American politicians
Politicians from Manhattan
Democratic Party members of the New York State Assembly
Road incident deaths in New York City
Burials at Calvary Cemetery (Queens)